Pentagon, aka Pentagon Washington, was a public affairs TV series broadcast by the DuMont Television Network from May 6, 1951, to November 24, 1952. The series aired Sundays at 8:30pm ET.

Episode status
Only the final episode from November 24, 1952, exists. This episode is held in the J. Fred MacDonald collection at the Library of Congress.

See also
List of programs broadcast by the DuMont Television Network
List of surviving DuMont Television Network broadcasts
1951-52 United States network television schedule

References

Bibliography
David Weinstein, The Forgotten Network: DuMont and the Birth of American Television (Philadelphia: Temple University Press, 2004) 
Alex McNeil, Total Television, Fourth edition (New York: Penguin Books, 1980) 
Tim Brooks and Earle Marsh, The Complete Directory to Prime Time Network TV Shows, Third edition (New York: Ballantine Books, 1964)

External links
Pentagon (TV series) at IMDB
DuMont historical website

DuMont Television Network original programming
1951 American television series debuts
1952 American television series endings
Black-and-white American television shows
DuMont news programming